Badaje  is a village in Kasaragod district in the state of Kerala, India.
It is a small village in Manjeshwaram Taluk.

History
The name Badaje is derived from the name of old ruler of Badaje 'Badja'.

Transportation
Local roads have access to National Highway No.66 which connects to Mangalore in the north and Calicut in the south.  The nearest railway station is Manjeshwar on Mangalore-Palakkad line and Mangalore International Airport is the nearest airport.

Education

 Govt. Lower Primary School, Badaje
 Sphoorthy Vidya Nikethan, Badaje

Landmarks
 Shri Mahalingeshwara Temple

Shri Mahalingeshwara Temple is a very old temple and Lord Shiva is the main deity here. According to the local stories, Shivalinga in this temple was installed by Khara Rakshasa. The festival of the temple is celebrated during the month of January, on the day of Makarasankranti.
 Machampady Juma Masjid

Demographics
 India census, Badaje had a population of 6103 with 3012 males and 3091 females.

Languages
This locality is an essentially multi-lingual region. The people speak Tulu, Kannada, Malayalam,  Beary bashe and Konkani. Migrant workers also speak Hindi and Tamil languages. This village is part of Manjeshwar (State Assembly constituency) which is under Kasaragod (Lok Sabha constituency).

See also
 Manjeshwar
 Kasaragod
 Pavoor

References

External links
All about Badaje

Manjeshwar area